Gabriel Jaime Barrabas Gómez Jaramillo (born 8 December 1959) is a retired Colombian footballer who played as a central midfielder.

Club career
During his career, Gómez played mainly for hometown side Atlético Nacional, representing the club in eight professional seasons, in two different spells, and helping the team to three first division titles. 

Incidentally, in 1989, when Atlético won the Libertadores Cup, he played for city neighbours Independiente Medellín, having signed from Club Deportivo Los Millonarios. After returning to Nacional in 1991, Gómez retired four years later, at the age of 36.

After he retired from playing, Gómez became a football coach. He has managed Envigado, Atlético Nacional, Unión Magdalena and Atlético Bucaramanga in Colombia, Deportivo Quito in Ecuador and Caracas FC in Venezuela.

International career
During nearly one full decade, Gómez was capped 49 times for Colombia, scoring twice. He represented the nation in two FIFA World Cups, 1990 and 1994, and three Copa América tournaments: 1987, 1989 and 1993.

In the World Cup, Gómez started in all four of his country's matches in 1990, as Colombia were ousted in the round of 16 by Cameroon. Four years later, in the United States, he received death threats from unknown people prior to the second group stage match against the hosts, and refused to appear in the game. In the days following the 1–2 loss which confirmed the South American team's elimination, defender Andrés Escobar was murdered upon returning home, after scoring an own goal in the match.

Honours

Personal
Gómez's older brother, Hernán Darío, coached the national teams of Colombia and Ecuador, amongst others. In 1998, whilst in charge of the former, he also received anonymous death threats.

References

External links

1959 births
Living people
Footballers from Medellín
Colombian footballers
Association football midfielders
Categoría Primera A players
Atlético Nacional footballers
Millonarios F.C. players
Independiente Medellín footballers
Colombia international footballers
1990 FIFA World Cup players
1994 FIFA World Cup players
1987 Copa América players
1989 Copa América players
1993 Copa América players
Colombian football managers
Atlético Nacional managers
S.D. Quito managers
Jaguares de Córdoba managers